Cycloocta-1,5-diene is a cyclic hydrocarbon with the chemical formula , specifically .

There are three configurational isomers with this structure, that differ by the arrangement of the four C–C single bonds adjacent to the double bonds.

Generally abbreviated COD, the  isomer of this diene is a useful precursor to other organic compounds and serves as a ligand in organometallic chemistry. It is a colorless liquid with a strong odor.  1,5-Cyclooctadiene can be prepared by dimerization of butadiene in the presence of a nickel catalyst, a coproduct being vinylcyclohexene. Approximately 10,000 tons were produced in 2005.

 Organic reactions 
COD reacts with borane to give 9-borabicyclo[3.3.1]nonane, commonly known as 9-BBN, a reagent in organic chemistry used in hydroborations:

COD adds  (or similar reagents) to give 2,6-dichloro-9-thiabicyclo[3.3.1]nonane:

The resulting dichloride can be further modified as the diazide or dicyano derivative in a nucleophilic substitution aided by anchimeric assistance.

 Metal complexes 

1,5-COD binds to low-valent metals via both alkene groups. Metal-COD complexes are attractive because they are sufficiently stable to be isolated, often being more robust than related ethylene complexes. The stability of COD complexes is attributable to the chelate effect. The COD ligands are easily displaced by other ligands, such as phosphines.

 is prepared by reduction of anhydrous nickel acetylacetonate in the presence of the ligand, using triethylaluminium

The related  is prepared by a more circuitous route involving the dilithium cyclooctatetraene:

Extensive work has been reported on complexes of COD, much of which has been described in volumes 25, 26, and 28 of Inorganic Syntheses. The platinum complex is a precursor to a 16-electron complex of ethylene:

COD complexes are useful as starting materials; one noteworthy example is the reaction:

The product  is highly toxic, thus it is advantageous to generate it in the reaction vessel upon demand.

The  complexes with nickel, palladium, and platinum have tetrahedral geometry, whereas  complexes of rhodium and iridium are square planar.

(E,E)-COD

The highly strained trans,trans isomer of 1,5-cyclooctadiene is a known compound. (E,E)-COD was first synthesized by George M. Whitesides and Arthur C. Cope in 1969 by photoisomerization of the cis,cis compound. Another synthesis (double elimination reaction from a cyclooctane ring) was reported by Rolf Huisgen in 1987. The molecular conformation of (E,E'')-COD is twisted rather than chair-like. The compound has been investigated as a click chemistry mediator.

References
 

Cycloalkenes
Dienes
Ligands
Eight-membered rings
Foul-smelling chemicals